Baumgart is a surname. Notable people with the surname include:

 Anna Baumgart (born 1966), Polish artist
 Bernd Baumgart (born 1955), German rower who competed for East Germany in the 1976 Summer Olympics
 Emílio Henrique Baumgart (1889–1943), Brazilian engineer
 James Baumgart (born 1938), former American member of the Wisconsin State Assembly and the Wisconsin State Senate
 Lloyd R. Baumgart (1908–1985), former American member of the Wisconsin State Assembly
 Steffen Baumgart (born 1972), German football player and manager
 Tom Baumgart (born 1997), German footballer

See also
 Baumgarten (surname)